
Gmina Krzynowłoga Mała is a rural gmina (administrative district) in Przasnysz County, Masovian Voivodeship, in east-central Poland. Its seat is the village of Krzynowłoga Mała, which lies approximately 16 kilometres (10 mi) north-west of Przasnysz and 104 km (64 mi) north of Warsaw.

Villages
Gmina Krzynowłoga Mała contains the villages and settlements of: 
 
 Borowe-Chrzczany
 Borowe-Gryki
 Bystre-Chrzany
 Chmieleń Wielki
 Chmielonek
 Cichowo
 Czaplice-Bąki
 Czaplice-Kurki
 Gadomiec-Jędryki
 Gadomiec-Wyraki
 Goski-Wąsosze
 Grabowo-Rżańce
 Kaki-Mroczki
 Kawieczyno
 Rudno-Kosiły
 Krajewo Wielkie
 Krajewo-Kłódki
 Krajewo-Wierciochy
 Krzynowłoga Mała
 Łanięta
 Łoje
 Marianowo
 Masiak
 Morawy Wielkie
 Ostrowe-Stańczyki
 Ożumiech
 Piastowo
 Plewnik
 Romany-Fuszki
 Romany-Janowięta
 Romany-Sebory
 Romany-Sędzięta
 Rudno Jeziorowe
 Rudno Kmiece
 Skierkowizna
 Świniary
 Ulatowo-Adamy
 Ulatowo-Borzuchy
 Ulatowo-Czerniaki
 Ulatowo-Zalesie
 Ulatowo-Żyły
 Wiktorowo
 Wiktorowo-Kolonia

Neighbouring gminas
Gmina Krzynowłoga Mała is bordered by the gminas of Chorzele, Czernice Borowe, Dzierzgowo, Jednorożec and Przasnysz.

References

Polish official population figures 2006

Krzynowloga Mala
Przasnysz County